Marc Ferland may refer to:

 Marc Ferland (politician) (born 1942), Progressive Conservative member of the Canadian House of Commons
 Marc Ferland (figure skater), retired Canadian figure skater